Boyfriend in Wonderland is the fourth EP by South Korean boy band Boyfriend. It was released physically March 9, 2015.

Track listing

References 

2015 EPs
Boyfriend (band) EPs
Starship Entertainment EPs
Kakao M EPs